Syneora mundifera, the forest bark moth, is a moth of the family Geometridae first described by Francis Walker in 1860. It is found in Australia.

The wingspan is about 40 mm.

References

Boarmiini